The City Treasurer of Chicago is an elected official of the City of Chicago.

Current occupant

The current City Treasurer of Chicago is Democrat Melissa Conyears.   Conyears was elected by Chicago citizens on April 2, 2019, and took the oath of office on May 20, 2019. She was preceded in office by Kurt Summers. Conyears was elected in the 2019 Chicago runoff election, which also included the office of mayor, beating 47th Ward Alderman Ameya Pawar. She is the fourth African American woman to hold to position after Stephanie Neely and Judy Rice and Barbara Lumpkin.

Duties of the Treasurer 
The City Treasurer’s Office is the custodian and manager of all cash and investments for the City of Chicago, the four City employee pension funds, and the Chicago Teacher’s Pension Fund. Additionally, the Treasurer’s Office manages a number of programs that promote financial education and small business growth in Chicago’s neighborhoods. The Treasurer is one of three city-wide elected officials in the City of Chicago, with the Mayor and the Clerk being the others.

The City Treasurer's office operates a web page describing the office's powers and duties.

City Treasurers

References

External links 
 City Treasurer of Chicago's Office